Noble Township is one of twelve townships in Rush County, Indiana. As of the 2010 census, its population was 630 and it contained 267 housing units.

Geography

Unincorporated towns
 New Salem at 
(This list is based on USGS data and may include former settlements.)

References

External links
 Indiana Township Association
 United Township Association of Indiana

Townships in Rush County, Indiana
Townships in Indiana